Éva Szabó (30 October 1945 – November 2022) was a Hungarian professional tennis player.

Playing for Hungary in the Fed Cup, Szabó has accumulated a win–loss record of 8–5. She played in singles at the French Open in 1975. She lost to the American Janet Newberry in the quarterfinals.

Career finals

Singles (7–4)

Doubles (6–2)

References

External links
 

1945 births
2022 deaths
Hungarian female tennis players
20th-century Hungarian women